Koppal Institute of Medical Sciences is a government medical college established in 2015 and is located in Koppal, Karnataka. The college accommodates 150 undergraduate MBBS seats but no postgraduate seats. The medical college and the medical courses are recognized by Medical Council of India.

Admissions

Undergraduate courses

M.B.B.S. 
The college offers a four and a half year M.B.B.S. course with a one-year compulsory rotating internship in affiliated hospitals.

Departments

ANATOMY
ANESTHESIA
BIOCHEMISTRY
COMMUNITY MEDICINE
DENTISTRY
EAR, NOSE AND THROAT
GENERAL MEDICINE
GENERAL SURGERY
MEDICINE
MICROBIOLOGY
OBSTETRICS AND GYNAECOLOGY
OPHTHALMOLOGY
ORTHOPEDICS
PAEDIATRIC
PATHOLOGY
PHARMACOLOGY
PHYSIOLOGY
PSYCHIATRY
RADIOLOGY
SKIN & VENEREAL DISEASES
TUBERCULOSIS AND CHEST

References

External links
 

Medical colleges in Karnataka
Universities and colleges in Koppal district